José-Alain Sahel is a French ophthalmologist and scientist. He is currently the chair of the Department of Ophthalmology at the University of Pittsburgh School of Medicine, director of the UPMC Eye Center, and the Eye and Ear Foundation Chair of Ophthalmology. Dr. Sahel previously led the Vision Institute (French: Institut de la Vision) in Paris, a research center associated with the one of the oldest eye hospitals of Europe - Quinze-Vingts National Eye Hospital in Paris, founded in 1260. He is a pioneer in the field of artificial retina and eye regenerative therapies. He is a member of the French Academy of Sciences.

Biography

José-Alain Sahel was born in Tlemcen (Algeria) in 1955. He has studied medicine in the Strasbourg University and in Lariboisière, St. Louis.  In 1980 he received a Doctorate of Medicine with a Medal of the Faculty of Paris and in 1984 obtained his Specialisation in Ophthalmology. He spent his first 20 professional years in the University Hospital of Strasbourg working as ophthalmologist and after moved to Quinze-Vingts National Eye Hospital in Paris, where he became department head in 2001. At the same period he held a position of the Chief of Ophthalmology and Pathology Service at Adolphe de Rothschild Foundation.

José-Alain Sahel also held the chair of the Professor of Ophthalmology at the University Pierre and Marie Curie in Paris and the Professor of Biomedical Sciences (Cumberlege Chair) at University College London.
He was also a Visiting Professor at the Hebrew University in Jerusalem, where he collaborated with the world's leading specialists in the field, professors Daniel Albert and John Dowling.

In October 2016, José-Alain Sahel was hired by the University of Pittsburgh School of Medicine as chair of the Department of Ophthalmology, the director of the UPMC Eye Center, and the Eye and Ear Foundation Chair of Ophthalmology.

Research

José-Alain Sahel has contributed to advancements in basic and clinical research in the field of the vision. In 1992 he founded the Laboratory of Cellular and Molecular Physiopathology of the Retina in Strasbourg that specialized in translational research on the mechanisms of retinal cell degeneration.

Later this laboratory became the heart of the Vision Institute that José-Alain Sahel founded in Paris in 2008. This institute is one of the largest centres of integrated research on eye diseases in Europe and combines fifteen academic and clinical teams employing more than 250 researchers. There he continued his research on developmental biology, functional genomics, physiology and therapeutics (stem cells, gene therapy, pharmacology, artificial retina), research on relevant biomarkers and disease models. The common thread of his work is understanding and prevention of central vision loss through degeneration of photoreceptor cells (retinitis pigmentosa genetic) and age-related degeneration (AMD).

One of the major discoveries made by José-Alain Sahel and his colleagues Thierry Léveillard and Saddek Mohand-Said is that the rod photoreceptors produce a trophic factor (called sustainability factor cones or RdCVF for Rod-derived Cone Viability Factor) which uses the cone photoreceptors to survive. This discovery provided the biological basis for paracrine interactions between rods and cones showing that these interactions play a key role in maintaining the viability of photoreceptor cells. RdCVF through these factor could preserve central vision in some blinding human diseases.

Clinical research led by José-Alain Sahel is closely entangled with the experimental research: information processing, genetic, therapeutic research, including modelling, evidence of pre-clinical concepts, technological developments in imaging and surgery, forming an integrated site research on diseases of vision. Conducted clinical research include the first clinical gene therapy trials (Stargardt) with a North American center and integrated clinical of French National Reference Center on Retinal dystrophies with participation of more than 5000 patients. José-Alain Sahel coordinates large-scale European research programs on the retina, functional genomics, retinal neuroprotection, aging, and more recently on theraputicd. José-Alain Sahel is also a coordinator of a network of over 80 centres of excellence in clinical trials of retinal diseases among Europeans.

Research of José-Alain Sahel is also focused on the search for new therapeutic strategies to regain sight of visually impaired and blind people. He is one of the pioneers (with the Study Group on the retinal implant Argus II) in the Research on visual prostheses that could potentially become a breakthrough therapy for visually disabled patients, and allow them to regain some autonomy with recognition of objects or words, orientation and mobility. The results obtained and published as part of an international multicentre trial on retinal prostheses have resulted in FDA authorisation.

With the research team of Botond Roska at the Friedrich Miescher from Institute for Biomedical Research in Basel, Switzerland, the research group of José-Alain Sahel and Serge Picaud was among the first transforme through optogenetics cells an artificial retina retinal photoreceptors connected to circuit and to use gene therapy to restore vision. They also succeeded in showing that patients receiving this therapy is applicable can be identified and selected by non-invasive methods retinal imaging in high resolution, allowing to quickly benefit these patients discoveries from the laboratory. New high-resolution retinal imaging tools are also developed by José-Alain Sahel and his colleagues (optical coherence tomography, adaptive optics with Michel Paques), to refine the characterization of functional deficits and dispose of specific therapeutic efficacy and reproductibles markers.

Currently, José-Alain Sahel is a member of the Scientific Advisory Board of several public and private institutions : Faculty of Medicine Pierre and Marie Curie, Foundation Fighting Blindness, Steering Committee of the European Vision Institute (EVI EEIG), Chairman of the Steering Committee of European Vision Institute - Clinical Trials - Sites of excellence (EVI- CR), City of Paris. He serves on several editorial boards of prestigious journals such as the Journal of Clinical Investigation, Science Translational Medicine, JAMA - Ophthalmology, Progress in retinal and Eye Research .

The work of José-Alain Sahel and colleagues resulted in the publication of over 300 scientific papers and specialty generalist journals and fifty chapters in specialized books (in North American majority).  José-Alain Sahel has given more than 250 guest lectures, including: reading Wilmer (Johns Hopkins, 2003), the Leopold reading (Irvine, Ca, 2007), the reading Euretina (Vienna, 2008), the ARVO ( pre and - ARVO ) symposia, the Leopoldina Academy (2009), the College of France, at the Pasteur Institute, University Hadassah, before the German Societies, French, Israeli Neuroscience at the ISOPT the ISOCB, the ' ISER, ESF, Jules Gonin Play of the Retina Research Foundation, Reykjavik (2012)

José-Alain Sahel is also co-inventor and co-owner of more than twenty patents.

Selected publications

Awards

 Médaille de thèse (1980)
 Prix IPSEN de la recherche, Fondation IPSEN (1985)
 Prix de la Fondation de la recherche thérapeutique (1986)
 Research to Prevent Blindness International Scholar Award (1990)
 Prix de la recherche, Société Française d'Ophtalmologie (1990)
 Prix de parrainage, Fondation Alsace (1994)
 Médaille d'Or du Mérite Typhlophile, Paris (2001)
 Chevalier de l’Ordre national du mérite (2002)
 Prix Coup d'élan de la Fondation Schuller-Bettencourt (2002)
 Trustee Award (avec Thierry Léveillard), Foundation Fighting Blindness, États-Unis (2005)
 Prix Emilia Valori, Académie des sciences (2005)
 Membre de l’Académie européenne d’Ophtalmologie (2006)
 Grand Prix scientifique de la Fondation NRJ, Institut de France (2006)
 Alcon Research Institute Alumni Award for Excellence in Vision Research (2006)
 Membre de l’International Academy of Ophtalmology (2007)
 Prix des Bâtisseurs, Réseau de Recherche en Santé de la Vision, Québec (2007)
 Prix Altran pour l’innovation, Fondation Altran (2007)
 Médaille d’or, Université Pierre et Marie Curie (2008)
 Chevalier de la Légion d’Honneur (2008)
 Membre de l’Académie des Sciences, Institut de France (2007)
 Membre d’honneur DOG (2008)
 Doctorat Honoris Causa, Université de Genève (2010)
 Coscas Medal, Retina 2012, Rome (2012)
 Lecture Jules Gonin, Prix de la Retina Research Foundation, Reykjavik (2012)
 Médaille de l'innovation du CNRS (2012)12
 Officier de l’Ordre National du Mérite (2012)
 ARVO Silver Fellow (2013)
 The Llura Liggett Gund Award (2015)

Companies created

 Fovéa Pharmaceuticals (created in 2005, acquired by Sanofi Aventis)
 StreetLab (created in 2011)  a company dedicated to the evaluation and development of new products to improve the autonomy and quality of life of visually impaired.
 GenSight Biologics (founded in 2012 dedicated to the development of treatments for degenerative diseases of the retina based on the use of gene therapy)
 Pixium (founded in 2012 Pixium developing a new generation of artificial retina designed to be implanted in the eye of patients who have lost their sight)

References

External links
 
 The Vision Institut (Institut de la Vision)
 StreetLab
 GenSight Biologics
 Pixium Vision

French ophthalmologists
Members of the French Academy of Sciences
1955 births
French people of Algerian descent
Living people
University of Pittsburgh faculty